Björgvin Hólm (19 November 1934 – 3 April 1999) was an Icelandic athlete. He competed in the men's decathlon at the 1960 Summer Olympics.

References

1934 births
1999 deaths
Athletes (track and field) at the 1960 Summer Olympics
Icelandic decathletes
Olympic athletes of Iceland
Sportspeople from Reykjavík